Fred, Fredi or Freddie Washington may refer to: 

Fred Washington (offensive tackle) (1944–1985), American football offensive tackle
Fred Washington (defensive tackle) (1967–1990), American football defensive tackle
Fredi Washington (1903–1994), film actress in the 1920s and 1930s
Freddie Washington (bassist), American jazz-influenced bass guitarist
Freddie Washington (pianist) (c. 1900–?), American jazz pianist
Freddie "Boom Boom" Washington, a character in the TV series Welcome Back, Kotter
Freddie Washington (saxophone player), American jazz saxophone player, member of the St. Louis Metropolitan Jazz Quintet with Ronnie Burrage